Gong Jun (born 29 November 1992), also known as Simon Gong, is a Chinese actor. He gained attention for his role in Lost Love in Times (2017), and further recognition for his roles in Begin Again (2020), and Word of Honor (2021).

Early life 
Gong Jun was born on 29 November 1992, in Chengdu, Sichuan, China. He studied art in the second year of high school, a teacher came to the school to search for students to learn performance or choreography. Gong was selected by the teacher to study acting due to his appearance. At the beginning, Gong took the exam at Nanjing University of the Arts. He passed the preliminary examination but did not have the courage to participate in the second examination, since he was not well prepared. Later, Gong went to Beijing to participate in intensive training. After a long and difficult training, Gong took his entrance examination and was finally admitted to the Performance Department of Donghua University in Shanghai. He eventually graduated and moved to Beijing seeking opportunities in the entertainment industry. Gong had once signed with a company which promised to give him works and living expenses every month. Eventually, he did not receive any works or living expenses, so he terminated the contract. Prior to his debut, Gong was working as a model for various advertisements. Since he appeared in many advertisements, he was given a nickname: The Little Prince of Advertising.

Career

2015–2018: Acting debut and early beginnings 
In 2015, Gong made his acting debut in the historical drama Sword Chaos, played the upright and straightforward Bi Lu.

In 2016, Gong co-starred with Xu Feng (徐峰）in the youth drama Advance Bravely, adapted from the danmei novel with the same name (势不可挡) by Chai Ji Dan, in which he played Xia Yao, who becomes caught in a love triangle with a brother and a sister. He was selected by the novel author to act in her series after she saw his pictures on Weibo. On August 23, the urban adventure comedy film Lost in Japan was released.

In 2017, Gong co-starred with Chen Yao in the youth fantasy drama The Player, adapted from the online game "Fantasy Westward Journey" which is inspired by the classic novel “Journey to the West”, he played Ren Yi Xia, a game expert. He gained recognition for his role as the frank, loyal, free and unrestrained 11th Prince Yuan Che in the fantasy historical drama Lost Love in Times, based on the novel “Drunken Exquisiteness” (醉玲珑) by Shi Siye. Due to the success of the drama, Gong starred in a 12-episode spin-off of the drama as the main character with Xu Mu Chan. On September 19, Gong was announced as a member of reality show The Cute Teacher Arrives. On September 29, Gong science fiction film Rebirth Partner with Wang Wan Zhong was launched on Tencent Video, in which he played the helpful and cute student Yi Sheng. In December, he starred in the campus idol inspirational drama  Shining Like You.

In 2018, Gong co-starred with Zheng Qiu Hong in the ancient costume drama Unique Lady Part 1 and 2, based on the visual novel game “Lust for Gold” (好色千金), played the domineering and affectionate Prince Zhong Wu Mei.

2019–2020: Rising popularity 
In 2019, the French fantasy adventure animated film Tall Tales from the Magical Garden of Antoon Krings was released in mainland China. Gong dubbed the voice of Apollo. On November 7, the urban love drama Flavor It's Yours with Song Yiren was broadcast on iQIYI, in which he played Lu Wei Xun, a genius wine critic who is cold and unapproachable.

In 2020, Gong starred in the campus youth drama The Love Equations with Liu Renyu, in which he played Zhao Fan Zhou, a seriously dedicated student in the forensic science department, based on the novel “The Sweet Love Story” (舟而复始) by Zhao Qian Qian. On October 29, the urban emotional drama Begin Again with Zhou Yutong was broadcast, in which he played Ling Rui, a mature and kind surgeon. The series attracted attention, and Gong popularity became increasingly, with 1.8 billion views on Mango TV. On December 24, Unique Lady 2 with Zheng Qiu Hong was broadcast on Youku.

2021–present: Breakthrough 
In 2021, Gong's ancient Wuxia drama Word of Honor with Zhang Zhehan was broadcast on Youku, based on the danmei novel "Faraway Wanderers" (天涯客) by Priest. He played Wen Ke Xing, gentle, but also a deep-minded, innocent and cruel Chief of the Ghost Valley. Ma Tao, the main producer of Word of Honor was not familiar with him, but several of her friends recommended him to her. This gave Gong the opportunity to audition, he got the role through auditioning with Wen Kexing's drinking scene and after Long Que's death. The series surprisingly became a hit, opened with 8.2 scored on Douban and steadily increasing to 8.6, became the highest rated danmei drama on the site. The drama also received over 11 billion views on China popular media platform Douyin. On April 12, he co-starred with Qiao Xin in the romantic suspense drama Dream Garden, played Lin Shen, a professional psychological counsellor, the series was later aired on December. On July 5, Gong was announced as a member of reality show Chinese Restaurant 5 along with Huang Xiaoming, Ning Jing, Zhou Ye, Ding Zhen and Annabel Yao. On July 8, the rescue emotional drama The Flaming Heart with Zhang Huiwen was broadcast, in which he played Huo Yan, an introverted and determined firefighter. On July 20, Gong began filming alongside Dilraba Dilmurat and Liu Yuning in the historical drama Legend of Anle, based on the novel "The Emperor's Book" (帝皇书) by Xing Ling, acting as Crown Prince Han Ye. On December 7, Gong attended the booting ceremony and began working on the new youth romance drama Rising With The Wind with Zhong Chuxi, based on the novel with the same name by Wei Zai (未再). He will be playing the role of Xu Si, an investor.

On February 1, 2022, Gong performed two programs at the China Dragon TV Spring Festival Gala; he danced with the robots and performed the song “Gong Xi Fa Cai” (恭喜發財, a single released by Gong Jun in Jan 2022), as well as made God of Fruit Fortune with Yang Yong, the master chef of state banquet.  On the same day, he performed the song “The Motherland Will Never Forget” (祖國不會忘記) along with Li Yifeng and Du Jiang at the Hundred Flowers Welcome Spring Gala organized by the China Federation of Literature and Art Circles.  On February 15, Gong performed “Happy Lantern Festival” (正月十五鬧花燈) along with Mao Xiaotong, etc. at the CCTV Lantern Festival Gala. On April 23, Gong performed two songs, “Light Up The Future” (把未來點亮) and “Welcoming Dreams” (迎夢而來), at the Global Chinese Music Chart organized by the CCTV Music Channel CCTV-15. On Jun 28, Gong won the “Most Popular Actor of the Year” at the Golden Bud Network Film and Television Festival. In June, the eighth season of "Go Fighting!" officially announced his return along with Jia Nai Liang, Yue Yun Peng, Wang Xun, Justin, Johnny Huang, Yang Chao Yue, Guo Jing Fei. In July, Gong and Yang Mi announced as leads in Fox Spirit Matchmaker: Yue Hong, adapted from the manhua "Hu Yao Xiao Hong Niag" (狐妖小红娘) by Tuo Xiao Xin (庹小新).  On September 27, Gong’s charity miniseries “Guardian of Alpine Plants” co-produced by Xinhua News and Elle was broadcast.

On January 22, 2023, Gong performed two programs at the China Dragon TV Spring Festival Gala; he performed a magic show and performed the song “Sword Like a Dream” (刀劍如夢) in four avatars, demonstrating the four traditional skills of piano, chess, calligraphy and painting in different chivalrous styles.  On the same day, Gong joined the famous drama masters to perform the show “Looking at the Dreamer in Beijing” (大戲看北京之夢中人) at the Beijing TV Spring Festival Gala; the show used ingenious combination of Chinese opera and pop music.  On January 24, Gong attended the 2023 China Online Audio-Visual Ceremony and performed as a museum interpreter in one of the shows (青年志). On February 21, Madame Tussauds Shanghai announced that Gong Jun will be the first actor to have a wax figure in the E-Fashion zone of the wax museum. Madame Tussauds unveiled his wax figure during a ceremony on March 4, 2023.

Endorsements and ambassadorships

Endorsements 
In 2019, Gong was named as brand ambassador for men's care products Mentholatum. He was chosen as brand ambassador for skincare Little Touch, spokesperson for clinical skincare DR. WU, and officer for Youku in 2020.

With the success of the series Word of Honor, Gong commercial resources have been soaring. Partnered with 31 brands, his endorsements covered multiple categories such as sunscreen protection L'Oréal Paris, health supplements products Centrum, car brand Roewe, fast food KFC, beauty cosmetics 3CE Stylenanda, fruity instant coffee Nescafé, smartphone Honor, and sportswear 361 Degrees. He also the face of luxury brands such as Louis Vuitton and Tiffany & Co.

In April 2021, Gong was announced as spokesperson for Vita lemon flavoured drink, but in July ceased his commercial cooperation with Vitasoy after an employee circulated a memo online offering condolences to the family of a worker who stabbed a Hong Kong policeman, then committed suicide.

On his birthday, November 29, Gong Jun was promoted to brand spokesperson for YA-MAN and was awarded the brand ambassador title by Tiffany. On December 1, Honor launched the Honor 60 series in China and announced Gong Jun as the Honor 60 Series Global Spokesperson.

In February 2022, Italian luxury brand Hogan (owned by the TOD’S Group) announced Gong as its global ambassador. The shoes Gong endorsed sold out at the brand's Tmall flagship store in six hours, demonstrating his substantial influence on the luxury brand. By May 2022, Gong collaborated with 6 more brands such as Colgate, Safeguard, Mujosh, and Charlotte Tilbury.

In March 2023, Deeyeo (a famous China brand that specializes in disposable hygiene products) announced Gong as its brand ambassador.

Commercial influences 
In 2021, Honor launched the Honor 50 series in China and announced Gong as their smartphone spokesperson. This was the firm's first major smartphone release since it was sold by Huawei. The series sales exceeded ¥500 million in one minute. This lead to their market share rising by 14.6% and helped them return to the top three brands in China's mobile market. Similarly, after 361 Degrees announced Gong as their global spokesperson, their stock price soared by 14.37%. By the first half of 2021, their net profit rose 32.9% into ¥401.4 million, gained 15.7% in revenue and 28.0% in gross profit. On June 17, Roewe announced the release of 500 Roewe RX5 PLUS Limited Edition and Gong was their global spokesperson. The first batch of 100 cars sold out within 9 minutes 20 seconds, achieving a new record for cars sold every 2 seconds in a single day. After selling 100 cars per day for 5 consecutive days, the series completely sold out with a total pre-sale value of ¥644 million. On June 23, Gong was announced as brand ambassador for luxury fashion brand Louis Vuitton. On October 15, Gong was chosen as Beauty Ambassador for the 18th Cosmo Beauty Awards.

Recognitions 

In the first half of 2021, Gong gained over 8 million followers and became the most-followed and most-searched artist on Sina Weibo platform, appearing 187 times on their real-time hot search trends list. Gong was named as the hottest actor of the second quarter and was listed as one of 23 GQ's Men of The Year.

Gong has graced the front covers of various magazines such as Harper's Bazaar, SE Weekly, OK!, Madame Figaro, Elle, Glitz, Lifestyle, Esquire, T Magazine, and Cosmopolitan.

Philanthropy 
In 2018, Gong Jun released his first photobook, “1129”. All proceeds from the book were donated to charity to support the development of public welfare undertakings. In 2020, Gong donated ¥150,000 to China Foundation for Poverty Alleviation to equip three rural schools in Nanjiang County, Sichuan Province with kitchen equipment. He was also chosen as Moji Weather Charity Ambassador and Officer for two consecutive years.

In 2021, Gong was appointed as Hello Childhood Charity Ambassador, Charity Promotional Ambassador for World Book Day, Charity Communication Ambassador for International Day for Biological Diversity, and Charity Advocacy Ambassador for World Environment Day.

In April 2021, Word of Honor’s outfits were sold through online auction. Among them, the red costume of Wen Ke Xing played by Gong Jun was sold at the highest price ¥224,601 Yuan, the auction earned total ¥584,207 Yuan for Wen’s costumes and accessories. After the event, his red costume proceeds were donated towards China Social Assistance Foundation as part of public welfare project. On July 21, Gong donated ¥500,000 Yuan to China Foundation for Poverty Alleviation for flood relief efforts in Henan. Gong Jun's Studio reached out to Lock & Lock donated 10,000 water bottles, 1000 blankets, 200 quilts, and 200 sets of bedding supplies to support the flood victims and disaster areas. Gong Jun's Studio along with Unif Beef jointly donated further 5000 boxes of noodles to support the frontline disaster relief. Gong joined hands with 361 Degrees donated ¥10 million Yuan in cash and materials to help with flood relief and future restoration work. On July 27, as part of the  sustainability program “L’Oréal for the Future”, the Group has set up €50 million Euro to help with the restoration of ecological.

Due to the pandemic situation in China, Gong donated 65,000 medical and N95 masks in April 2022. He donated an additional 3,536 rapid COVID-19 antigen kits and hand sanitizers, plus 950 boxes of milk and snacks to his alma mater, Donghua University. On September 08, Gong donated ¥500,000 to support Sichuan earthquake relief efforts.

Filmography

Television Series

Film/Short Film

Dubbing

Television Show

Awards and Nominations

Discography

Concert

References

External links 

 
 
 

1992 births
Living people
Actors from Chengdu
21st-century Chinese male actors
Donghua University alumni
Chinese male television actors